Shariq Hassan (born 7 December 1996) is an Indian actor who predominantly appears in Tamil films and television shows. He is known for his role in the 2016 film Pencil which marked his debut as an established actor.

Personal life
Shariq was born on December 7, 1996, in Chennai, Tamil Nadu. He is the son of Indian actor Riyaz Khan and actress Uma Riyaz Khan. He attended A V Meiyappan Matriculation Higher Secondary School completing his school at 12 grade and later graduated high school.

Career
Shariq debuted in the Tamil film Pencil alongside actors G. V. Prakash Kumar and Sri Divya. The film overall performed well in box office and had a success rate in theaters for running more than 40 days and was very well liked by critics. He also made his debut in the TV industry in the year 2018 by joining Bigg Boss (Tamil season 2) as a contestant. By joining Bigg Boss, he came into the limelight and gained fame in the industry. However he was later evicted from the show on the 49th day. In 2020, he signed up his next film titled as Jigiri Dosthu which received an average reception from critics. In 2021 he participated in the dance competition called BB Jodigal which aired on Star Vijay alongside his duo Anitha Sampath and won the show. In 2022 he signed up another project with actor Vishnu Vishal titled as Mohandas which is currently filming.

Filmography

Web series

Television

References

External links 

Indian film actors
1996 births
Living people
Actors in Tamil cinema
21st-century Indian actors
Bigg Boss (Tamil TV series) contestants